The 2000 Maryland Terrapins football team represented the University of Maryland in the 2000 NCAA Division I-A football season. In their fourth and final season under head coach Ron Vanderlinden, the Terrapins compiled a 5–6 record, finished in seventh place in the Atlantic Coast Conference, and were outscored by their opponents 284 to 247. The team's statistical leaders included Calvin McCall with 1,533 passing yards, LaMont Jordan with 920 rushing yards, and Guilian Gary with 568 receiving yards.

Schedule

Roster

References

Maryland
Maryland Terrapins football seasons
Maryland Terrapins football